Chi Piscium (χ Piscium) is a solitary, orange-hued star in the zodiac constellation of Pisces. It can be seen with the naked eye, having an apparent visual magnitude of +4.64. Based upon an annual parallax shift of 8.50 mas as seen from Earth, it is located about 384 light years from the Sun.

This is an evolved G-type giant star with a stellar classification of G8.5 III. There is a 94% chance that it is on the horizontal branch and is a red clump star, which means it is generating energy through helium fusion at its core. Chi Piscium is estimated to have 3.17 times the mass of the Sun, nearly 21 times the solar radius, and shines with 209 times the Sun's luminosity. It is around 380 million years old.

Naming

References

G-type giants
Horizontal-branch stars
Piscium, Chi
Pisces (constellation)
Durchmusterung objects
Piscium, 084
005571
0351
007087